New Game may refer to:
New Game, a term used in video games indicating the player starting a game from the beginning
New Game Plus, a video game mode which is typically unlocked after completing a video game, allowing the player to start a new game with certain stats or equipment carried over from previous play sessions
New Game!, a Japanese manga series by Shōtarō Tokunō
New Game (Tempo album), an album by Tempo
The New Game, an album by Mudvayne
 NewGame Software (aka Elemental Games), Russian game development company